The Happets in the Kingdom of the Sun (also shortened to La tròpa de trapo) is a 2010 Spanish 3D computer animated stop-motion film directed and produced by Àlex Colls from a script by Lola Beccaria, loosely based on a Catalan children's preschool show of the same name that aired on the Catalan TV3. It was released on 29 October 2010 in Spain, and won Best Animated Film at the 3rd Gaudí Awards.

Premise 
Mumu, a little cow, abandons her non-glam friends to become a star with very cool sheep, however, she soon comes to rue her decision.

Release 
The film had its world premiere at the 5th Madrid de Cine-Spanish Film Screenings in Madrid on 22 June 2010. It was released theatrically in Spain on 29 October 2010 by Alta Films.

Accolades 
Won Best Animated Film at the Gaudí Awards.
Nominated for the Goya Award for Best Animated Film at the 25th Goya Awards.

See also 
List of 3D films (2005 onwards)

References

External links 

2010 films
2010 3D films
2010 animated films
Spanish animated films
2010s Spanish-language films